Islamic Organisation for Food Security (IOFS;), is a food and agriculture organization and one of the eight specialized institutions of the Organisation of Islamic Cooperation focused on the development of agriculture and rural development with primary focus on widespread scarcity of food and food security of the member states. Its charter is formally signed by the 37 member states out of 57 as of 2022. The associated member states work in collaboration with IOFS.

Established in 2012 by adopting a resolution in the 39th session of the OIC Council of Foreign Ministers in Pakistan, it actively collaborates with intergovernmental organization such as Economic Cooperation Organization to promote its ideology within the scope of the OIC'S guidelines outlined for the food security.

History 
Islamic Organisation for Food Security was established on 17 November 2012 by adopting a resolution in the 39th session of Council of Foreign Ministers hosted by the Republic of Djibouti between 15 and 17 November 2012. However, it became a specialized institution of the OIC after adopting a resolution in the 40th session of Council of Foreign Ministers hosted between 9 and 11 December 2013 in Conakry, Guinea. It came into force on 19 February 2008 under the Article 21 of the Statute, OIC and its Secretariat became operational on 1 March 2018.

The sessions of IOFS are hosted by the ministers of food, agriculture, environment and water resources of the member states. They formulate action plans for food crisis and security and development of agriculture. The Republic of Kazakhstan is a full-fledged member of the IOFC which also serves its headquarters in Nur-Sultan.

Objectives 
IOFS is objectively focused on coordination, formulation and implementation of agricultural policies to reduce food crisis in its associated member states. It also conduct humanitarian assistance operations in the state of emergency. It also contribute in the field of desertification, information technology (IT), erosion, and deforestation in addition providing information concerning use of water resources. It also collaborate with other institutions to prevent spread of cross-species transmission, particularly border disease.

Member states

See also 
 World Food Programme
 International Fund for Agricultural Development
 Food and Agriculture Organization
 Organisation of Islamic Cooperation
 Economy of the Organisation of Islamic Cooperation

 COMSTECH

 Islamic World Educational, Scientific and Cultural Organization

 Islamic Development Bank
 Union of OIC News Agencies
 Islamic Committee of the International Crescent
 Women Development Organization

References

Further reading 
 
 

International economic organizations
Organisation of Islamic Cooperation specialized agencies
2012 establishments in Pakistan
Organizations based in Astana
Foundations based in Kazakhstan
Food and Agriculture Organization